Migrations is a 1988 French – Yugoslavian drama film directed by Aleksandar Petrović and starring Isabelle Huppert.

Cast
 Avtandil Makharadze as Vuk Isaković
 Isabelle Huppert as Dafina Isaković
 Richard Berry as Aranđel Isaković
 Bernard Blier
 Erland Josephson
 Dragan Nikolić as Pavel Isaković
 Miki Manojlović as Arnold de Sabrant
 Rade Marković as Prince Charles Alexander of Lorraine
 Petar Božović as Field Marshal von Berenklau
 Ljubomir Ćipranić as Sekula
 Jelica Sretenović
 Dobrica Jovanović
 Jovan Janićijević Burduš
 Ružica Sokić
 Aljoša Vučković

See also
 Isabelle Huppert on screen and stage

References

External links

1988 films
1988 drama films
1980s French-language films
Films directed by Aleksandar Petrović
French drama films
Serbian drama films
Yugoslav drama films
1980s French films